Sagwa, the Chinese Siamese Cat, or simply Sagwa, is a children's animated television series based on the children's book of the same name by Amy Tan which aired on PBS Kids, co-produced by Canada-based animation studio CinéGroupe and Sesame Street creator Sesame Workshop.

In the series, which is set , after the cinematograph was patented and during the late Qing dynasty, Sagwa has fun in her day-to-day life while learning and teaching valuable life lessons. The show is notable for its setting and messages about family obligations and loyalty. The show is also intentionally cross-cultural, with the theme song in both English and Chinese.

The series was developed and produced for television by executive producers George Daugherty and Michel Lemire, and producers David Ka Lik Wong and Leon G. Arcand.

The series aired from September 3, 2001, to October 5, 2002, running for one season and 40 episodes. The series was cancelled in 2002, ending on October 5 of that year, and as of 2019 is still aired on several networks worldwide.

The series won the Silver Plaque at the Chicago International Film Festival for Children's Film in 2001, as well as winning an Outstanding Individual in Animation award for background artist Valery Mihalkov at the 29th Daytime Emmy Awards and a "TV Series - Family/Children" award at WorldFest Houston in 2002.

Synopsis
Sagwa resides in a palace of a magistrate in China in what is assumed to be modern-day Fujian province (possibly during the late Qing dynasty, as shown by the characters' clothes), as part of a royal family of cats who have the ability to write with their tails. She and her siblings, along with various other cats and Fu-Fu the bat, have adventures that are usually accompanied by moral lessons, as is typical with most children's shows. However, one aspect of the show which sets it apart is its display of various elements of Chinese culture.

Characters

Miao family
 Sagwa Miao – (傻瓜 shǎguā, "silly melon") is the middle of the Miao family, as well as the titular protagonist of the series. Kind, curious, quick thinking, creative and often bossy. She was originally pure white in color but gained her current Siamese cat markings after falling into an inkpot. Sagwa is very talented in calligraphy and is said by her parents to have the best artistic skills in the Miao family. She has a golden-yellow and salmon-red Miao Family collar on her neck. While her name literally means "silly melon", it translates to an affectionate way of calling someone a fool. Voiced by Holly Gauthier-Frankel.
 Dongwa Miao – Dongwa (冬瓜 dōngguā, winter melon) is the eldest child of the Miao family. Intelligent, competitive and sometimes stubborn, Dongwa is independent and often prefers the company of the Alley Cats or solitary martial-arts practice to playing with his sisters. He is the only male child of this entire family and is also caring of his sisters despite the typical sibling squabbles that occur between them. He is cream-colored and has the traditional Siamese markings and has a purple Miao Family collar on his neck. Voiced by Oliver Grainger.
 Sheegwa Miao – Sheegwa (西瓜 xīguā, watermelon) is the youngest child of the Miao family. Curious, friendly, cheerful and full of energy, Sheegwa is also very optimistic and ascribes good intentions to almost every creature she meets. She is pure white in color, except for a pink tinge on her cheeks, and has a folded right ear. She also has a pink Miao Family collar (with a purple flower symbol on it) on her neck. Voiced by Jesse Vinet.
 Baba Wim Bao Miao – Baba Wim Bao (爸爸寶寶 bàba bǎobǎo, "father darling") is the father of the Miao family. He is very strict with his children, and in matters of hard work and duty, but also has a softer, playful side as well. Baba also fancies himself a devotee of Chinese Opera, although he has Beat deafness. He and Mama are the official calligraphers of the Foolish Magistrate. Baba, like Dongwa, is cream-colored and has typical Siamese facial markings. When Angwan took care of him, she called him Bu-Gu, "Cuckoo Bird". Voiced by Arthur Holden. Also voiced by Bruce Dinsmore in a flashback where he's shown as a younger version of himself.
 Mama Shao Faing Miao – Mama Shao Faing (媽媽小風 māma xiǎo fēng, "mother small wind") is the mother of the Miao family. Like Baba, she is also a loving but strict parent, but is usually more lenient and gentle than Baba. She and Sagwa have similar coloring and markings. Voiced by Ellen David.
 Nai-Nai Miao – Nai-Nai (奶奶 nǎinai, paternal grandmother) is the grandmother of the Miao family. Grey in color, she is old-fashioned, patient and full of wisdom. She often tells the kittens stories, and the family treats her as a respected ancestor. Voiced by Sonja Ball.
 Yeh-Yeh Miao – Yeh Yeh (爺爺 yéyé, paternal grandfather) is the grandfather of the Miao family. Like Nai-Nai, he is wise and patient. He is a good storyteller, and the kittens treat him with great love and respect. Voiced by Neil Shee.
 Uncle Miao – Uncle is the paternal uncle of Sagwa and Baba's brother. He's very much into ancient local history. Voiced by Neil Shee.
 Mae-Mae Miao – Mae-Mae is an aunt of Sagwa and Baba's in-law. She only appeared in the episode “Cha-Siu Bow Wow”, where she and her husband adopt a dog named Cha-Siu. That dog then became a cousin to the Miao kittens.
 Cha-Siu Miao – Cha-Siu (叉烧 chāshāo, cousin) is the adopted child of Uncle Miao and Aunt Chi-Chi, and a cousin of Sagwa, Dongwa and Sheegwa. He is a puppy dog and is different than the rest of the family. Sagwa and Sheegwa are happy to meet him for the first time and immediately bond with him. However, Dongwa isn't sure about him at first because he's a dog and different than everyone else. After the Sleeve Dogs make fun of him for being a dog and not being able to do anything, Dongwa later comforts him and they bond together. Voiced by Daniel Brochu.
 Chi-Chi Miao – Chi-Chi is another aunt of Sagwa and Mama's sister. She is an acrobat and teaches Sagwa and Sheegwa the art of acrobatics. Voiced by Susan Glover.
 Uncle Catfish is a mysterious Uncle to the Miao kittens who could also be a first cousin to Yeh-Yeh. He is half cat and half fish who lives in the water. Sagwa visited him once and he told her a tale of his great-grandmother. She was a cat who fell in the water to meet a fish and that made him who he is today. Voiced by Richard Newman.

Humans
 Shoo-Jee-Deh-Shan-Taiyeh Suen, the Foolish Magistrate – is the ruler of the province, Shoo-Jee-Deh-Shan-Taiyeh (湑稽的縣太爺 xū jī de xiàn tàiyé, "county high master of strain spirit ground-bowing") is a large and rather absent-minded man. He occasionally makes rules without reason, or makes ill-conceived decisions under pressure from his wife, Tai-Tai, but for the most part he is portrayed as a just and reasonable ruler. He is very fond of his cats, both for their calligraphy skills and for their ability to keep away mice and rats, of which he is deathly afraid of. In one of the episodes, when he says "No rules, no race.", his phrase turns into a musical drumbeat song as a result of being chanted by him. Voiced by Hiro Kanagawa.
 Tai-Tai Suen – Tai-Tai (太太 tàitài, "wife") is the Foolish Magistrate's wife. She is a very irritable, status-conscious woman who needs to prove her superiority to the "common" people of the village; however, she has flashes of kindness and reasonableness, in which she sees the consequences of her actions and apologizes to those she has wronged. She is very attached to the Sleeve Dogs who live in her robe, and values the cats only when they can bring praise to the family. She has a niece called Angwan. Voiced by Khaira Ledeyo.
 The Three Daughters – Ba-Do (白豆 bái dòu, "white bean") is the Magistrate's oldest daughter, who wears pink. Of the three daughters, Ba-Do is the protagonist. Luk-Do (绿豆 lǜ dòu, "green bean") is the Magistrate's middle daughter, and usually wears yellow. She is the more athletic of her sisters. Huang-Do (黄豆 huáng dòu, "yellow bean") is the Magistrate's youngest daughter, who is shorter than her sisters and usually wears blue. She is the more sensitive of her sisters. The three girls argue a great deal, but they are generally loving sisters who support each other. Voiced by Kathy Tsoi, Leanne Adachi and Rosa Yee, respectively.
 Chef Cook – Chef Cook not only prepares meals, but he also attends to medical care and other emergencies around the palace. He is a good friend of the Reader. Of the humans,seems to have the closest relationship with the Miao cats. Voiced by Raugi Yu.
 Seeyeh Suen is the Advising Reader of the Rules – Seeyeh (師爺 shīyé, "division master") is the Magistrate's brother who is in charge of reading his rules to the villagers; informally, he and the Cook often serve as advisors to the Magistrate as well. He also served as a tutor to the three daughters, and in one episode is discovered to be a talented poet as well. The reader is often the victim of mishaps caused by others in the palace. Voiced by Russell Yuen.
 Jun – is the new tutor to the three daughters who appears in the final episodes. She wears purple clothing and is shown to be from another village. Voiced by Annette Bening.
 Sir Richard is a clumsy English archaeologist who goes to the palace for tasks. He has brought Sagwa as his good luck kitten into caves and a hot air balloon to help find artifacts. They found the old poetry scrolls from the magistrate's ancestor, and an ancient fossil in a balloon as they were always up for adventure. Voiced by Simon Peacock.

Best friends / allies
 Fu-Fu – Fu-Fu (福蝠 fú fú, literally "lucky bat") is Sagwa's best friend and a sidekick. A cave-dwelling bat who wears round glasses, he is an extremely clumsy bat who often crashes into trees and other objects. He acts as Sagwa's conscience, warning her against taking unneeded risks, and then rescues Sagwa from the consequences of her adventures. Voiced by Rick Jones.
 The Mice – Shei-Hu, his cousin Shei-He, and a large group of other mice live unseen behind the Palace walls. They are close friends of the three kittens and do no harm to the Palace nor its inhabitants. However, the Foolish Magistrate and his family are very afraid of mice in general, so their presence must remain hidden. The mice are all voiced by Jaclyn Linetsky.
 Tung is a cricket that belonged to the magistrate that lived in a cage in his study. He sang a song that annoyed everyone but the magistrate who loved him. Tai Tai snuck behind his back to get rid of him and everyone else thought he died. With the help of Sagwa, he found his way back into the palace. He sang but everyone thought he was a different cricket. Voiced by Thor Bishopric.
 Hai-yo is a bluebird that appeared in tough guy Dongwa who hurt his wing in the alley. Dongwa tried to help him out and hide him in the clubhouse from the alleycats. He tried to get rid of him to impress his friends but was looking for him in the end to see if he's alright. They made up in the end. This bird loves flying and looking for worms in the alley. He also made a cameo appearance in "Sagwa's Lucky Bat" as he accidentally ran into FuFu while flying. Voiced by Thor Bishopric.
 Ping Wing, a pigeon kept by the magistrate in an episode. Sagwa and FuFu fought on who would get more attention for her. She hated the fighting between them and she only wanted to talk to them, if everyone made up. She's also skilled at flying while making music. Voiced by Sonja Ball.

Other characters
 The Alley Cats – are a group of cats who live in the streets and alleys outside the palace grounds. They include "bullies" such as Wing Wing, Jet Jet and Lik Lik, who tease the Miao kittens because of their "goody-goody" ways and privileged lives. Others, however, are friends to their siblings Sagwa, Dongwa and (to a lesser extent), Sheegwa, such as two female alley cats named "Hun-Hun" and "Ling" and three male ones named "Wong Ton”, Shao Pao (from "The Birds, Bees, and Silkworms"), and "Fam". Wing Wing is voiced by Michael Yarmush, Jet Jet is voiced by Mitchell Rothpan, Hun Hun is voiced by Kathy Tsoi, Lik Lik is voiced by Terrence Scammell, Wong Ton was voiced by Ian James Corlett, Ling was voiced by Kamiko Taka (in her only mainstream appearance), Shao Pao was voiced by Jesse Camacho, and Fam was voiced by Kyle Fairlie.
 The Sleeve Dogs – Ping, Pong and Pang are three small Pekingese dog triplets who live in the sleeves of Tai-Tai's robe. They antagonize the cats and boast of their superior status, but invariably their taunting and plots cause them to appear ridiculous and get into trouble in the end. Ping is voiced by Len Carlson, Pang is voiced by Sonja Ball and Pong is voiced by Michel Perron.
 Gunji- is a large red cat that is owned by Tai Tais aunt. She has a rooster pillow for her but when she was chasing Sagwa, Sagwas paw got stuck in the thread wrecking it. Gungi was blamed at first, but Sagwa told the truth of the accident then everyone knew what happened. In the end, Gungi apologized for being mean and Sagwa was rewarded by her parents. Voiced by Ricky Mabe.
 Fi-Fu and Fo-Fu are two bullies in a pack of bats that antagonized FuFu and made fun of his confidence before had to leave a full moon flight, and whom Sagwa once blamed as her kidnappers when making up a story about how she got a bad haircut. Fi-Fu is voiced by Len Carlson and Fo-Fu is voiced by Michel Perron.
 The Rat is a hungry brown rodent who always breaks into the palace to steal food. He led onto the kittens' making deals with them before they realized they were tricked. He was always chased by other cats to leave the palace. Voiced by Michael O’ Reilly.
 Oogway is an elderly tortoise that appeared in “The Tortoise and the Cat” he guided Sagwa in the garden and showed her the beauty of it. He did sleep a lot, and got a rose thorn out of Sagwa's foot. Also made cameo appearances in “The Favorite, and Lord of the Flies”. Voiced by Howard Ryshpan.
 Bei-Hu is a tribal cat with larger ears who are owned by traveling entertainers. Him and his family do things much different than other cats, as they catch and eat locusts as a hobby. He also pretty smart as he taught Sagwa how to travel home quick and what's East and West. Voiced by Eleanor Noble.

Many of the names of the characters derive from the Chinese language. Their spellings are romanizations (though not always Wade–Giles, but possibly dialects also), and differ from the standardized Pinyin system.

Additional voices
Additional voices were done by Leanne Adachi, Terrence Scammell, Simon Peacock, Howard Ryshpan, Carrie Finlay, Jonathan Koensgen, Chris Phillips, Dean Hagopian, Len Carlson, Mitchell Rothpan, Kyle Fairlie, Ricky Mabe, Michael Yarmush, Justin Bradley, Jaclyn Linetsky, Daniel Brochu, Walter Massey, Marc Donato, Olivia Garratt, Martin Watier, Andrew Rannells, Richard M. Dumont, Peter Linz, Tyler Bunch, Steven Crowder, Lisa Jai, Liz MacRae, Tyrone Savage, Catherine Disher, Kathy Tsoi, Brigid Tierney, Melissa Pirrera, Mark Camacho, Jesse Camacho, Bruce Dinsmore, Thor Bishopric, Pauline Little, Michel Perron, Peter Shinkoda, Linda Wang, Karen Lee, Kameron Louangxay, Kamiko Taka, Rosa Yee, Amy Chow, Michael O'Reilly, A.J. Henderson, Susan Glover, Jane Woods, Eleanor Noble, Derek Lowe and John Stocker.

Episodes

Home media

Canada
From 2002 to 2003, CinéGroupe Star released six volumes of the series in Canada. The VHS versions were released in both separate English and French versions, while the DVD counterparts featured both languages.

United States
In 2003, PBS Home Video and Warner Home Video brought each compilation of individual episodes to VHS and DVD.

On VHS, there were eight volumes with each containing three episodes. On DVD, there were four volumes which each contain six episodes each. Each DVD combined episodes from each pair of the VHS tapes. A pair of VHS titles (Best Friends and Family Fun) were renamed for the Feline and Friends and Family DVD. There was also a 6 volume DVD box set, with each disc consisting of 5-6 episodes. Every disc comprises episodes based on themes and were divided in half for those select sections of segments.

In 2006, Paramount Home Entertainment brought sixteen episodes from the show were released on one disc as part of the PBS Kids pack anthology set, with the two other discs containing episodes from Zoboomafoo and George Shrinks.

VHS
July 30, 2002
 Cat Nights, Flights and Delights – "Firefly Nights", "Fu-Fu's Full Moon Flight", "Shei-Hu's Secret"
 Feline Frenzy – "Explorer's Club", "Treasure Hunters", "Sick Day"

January 28, 2003
 Cat Tales – "How Sagwa Got Her Colors", "Fur Cut", "Stinky Tofu"
 Feline Festivities – "The New Year's Clean-Up", "Ba-Do and the Lantern Festival", "By the Light of the Moon"

April 1, 2003
 Best Friends – "Sagwa's Lucky Bat", "Cat and Mouse", "Dongwa's Best Friend"
 Family Fun – "Royal Cats", " The Cat and the Wind", "Ciao, Meow!"

July 29, 2003
 Kitty Concerto – "Alley Night Opera", "Comic Opera", "Tung, the Singing Cricket"
 Sagwa's Petting Zoo – "The Birds, the Bees and the Silkworms", "Panda-monium", "Sagwa, Fu-Fu, and the Whistling Pigeon"

DVD
January 28, 2003
 Sagwa's Storybook World (combines Cat Nights, Flights and Delights and Feline Frenzy)
 Cat Tales and Celebrations (combines Cat Tales and Feline Festivities)

July 29, 2003
 Great Purr-formances (combines Kitty Concerto and Sagwa's Petting Zoo)
 Feline Friends and Family (combines Sagwa's Feline Friends (a.k.a. Best Friends) and Sagwa's Family Tree (a.k.a. Family Fun)

Online streaming
In 2018, TFO's MiniMation YouTube channel began uploading episodes from the French version. The series was also briefly on Google Play.

References

External links

 Website of Amy Tan, Sagwa's author
 Cast and Crew
 
 

2000s American animated television series
2000s Canadian animated television series
2001 American television series debuts
2001 Canadian television series debuts
2002 American television series endings
2002 Canadian television series endings
American children's animated adventure television series
American children's animated education television series
American children's animated fantasy television series
American television series with live action and animation
American television shows based on children's books
Animated television series about cats
Animated television series about children
Animated television series about families
Animated television series about siblings
Anime-influenced Western animated television series
Australian Broadcasting Corporation original programming
Canadian children's animated adventure television series
Canadian children's animated education television series
Canadian children's animated fantasy television series
Canadian television series with live action and animation
Canadian television shows based on children's books
English-language television shows
PBS Kids shows
PBS original programming
Television series by Sesame Workshop
Television shows filmed in Montreal
Television series set in the Qing dynasty
TVO original programming
Works by Amy Tan